Chavdar Tsvetkov (born 8 March 1953 in Svoge) is a former Bulgarian footballer who played as a winger. He played for Sportist Svoge, Austria Wien, Iraklis Thessaloniki, Aris Limassol, and spent ten years at Slavia Sofia where he scored 104 goals in 255 matches in the Bulgarian A Group.

Honours

Club
Slavia Sofia
 Bulgarian Cup (2): 1975, 1980

Austria Wien
 Austrian Cup: 1982

References

External links

1953 births
Living people
Bulgarian footballers
Bulgaria international footballers
Association football forwards
PFC Slavia Sofia players
FK Austria Wien players
Iraklis Thessaloniki F.C. players
Aris Limassol FC players
First Professional Football League (Bulgaria) players
Austrian Football Bundesliga players
Bulgarian expatriate footballers
Expatriate footballers in Austria
Bulgarian expatriate sportspeople in Austria
Expatriate footballers in Greece
Bulgarian expatriate sportspeople in Greece
Expatriate footballers in Cyprus
Bulgarian expatriate sportspeople in Cyprus
People from Svoge
Sportspeople from Sofia Province